The Shriners Hospitals for Children College Classic is an annual six-team college baseball tournament held in Houston and hosted by the Astros Foundation. The 15th annual tournament was held at Minute Maid Park in March 2015. It was initially called Astros College Classic from 2001 through 2002, the Minute Maid Park College Classic from 2003 through 2007, and the Houston College Classic from 2008 through 2015. In December 2015, the Astros Foundation and Shriners Hospitals for Children announced a multi-year naming rights agreement for the tournament, rebranding the event the Shriners Hospitals for Children College Classic.

As part of the agreement with Shriners Hospitals for Children, the Astros Foundation announced that the 2016 Shriners Hospitals for Children College Classic would be nationally televised for the first time in history on MLB Network. 

The College Classic is seen as the start of the college baseball season in Texas. At the end of the tournament, a Most Outstanding Player and an All-Tournament Team are announced.

The event is normally held in early March.

The 2020 edition of the event happened before the breakout of the COVID-19.

Competitors
The Houston Cougars of the American Athletic Conference and Rice Owls of Conference USA who hold a rivalry, compete in the tournament annually. The other four teams invited to the tournament alternate by year.

Often, teams competing in the Classic are highly ranked. In 2002, the Classic involved three teams that ended the preceding season ranked in the top 25 of the Baseball Weekly/ESPN, Baseball America, and Collegiate Baseball year-end polls: the Rice Owls, Texas Tech Red Raiders, and Baylor Bears. The 2005 Classic included four top ranked teams: the #11 Baylor Bears, #13 Texas A&M Aggies, #19 Rice Owls, and #23 Oklahoma State Cowboys. Collegiate Baseball ranked all six teams competing in the 2007 Classic: they ranked the Rice Owls the top team in college baseball, and also ranked the #8 Vanderbilt Commodores, #14 Arizona State Sun Devils, #21 Baylor Bears, and #33 Houston Cougars. The Texas Longhorns and Rice Owls participated in the Classic when they won the College World Series championship in 2002 and 2003, respectively. The Texas Tech Red Raiders have appeared in the Houston College Classic seven times: in 2001, 2002, 2004, 2006, 2008, 2010, and 2012.

2018
For the 2018 classic, three SEC teams, Kentucky, Mississippi State, and Vanderbilt will be matched against three local universities: Houston, Sam Houston State and Louisiana.  The three SEC teams will play each of the three local teams once.

By Year

Most Outstanding Players

Teams by number of appearances

See also

Silver Glove series
Liberty Bell Classic
State Farm College Baseball Showdown

References

External links

2001 establishments in Texas
Annual events in Texas
Baseball competitions in Houston
College baseball tournaments in the United States
Recurring sporting events established in 2001
Houston Astros
Houston Cougars baseball
Rice Owls baseball
College Classic
College sports tournaments in Texas